Tainá 2: A New Amazon Adventure is a 2004 Brazilian film directed by Mauro Lima. It is the second film in Tainá film series and a sequel to Tainá: An Adventure in the Amazon.

It was shot in Manaus, the capital of the state of Amazonas, and also in Ubatuba, São Paulo, where Amazônia was simulated in close-ups. A prequel, Tainá 3: The Origin, was released in 2011.

Plot
The evil woman Zuzu gets these two men to go to the jungle and take the animals and this little amazon jungle girl Tainá have to rescue the animals.
And the men shot the mother of the cute little jungle cat, and the jungle cat was only a little baby and it got very sad.

Carlito, a young boy helps Taina rescue animals from evil woman. Carlito has lost his puppy and he's looking for it, but Catiti found it.

Cast
Eunice Baía as Tainá
Chris Couto as Zuzu
Kadu Moliterno as Gaspar
Vitor Morosini as Carlitos
Arilene Rodrigues as Catiti
Patrick Raniere as Tequan Richmond
Leandro Hassum as Zé Grilo
Aramis Trindade as Lacraia
Roney Villela as Carcará
Ruy Polanah as Tigê
Daniel Munduruku as Pajé Tatu Pituna

References

External links
 
 

2000s adventure comedy films
2004 films
Brazilian adventure films
Brazilian children's films
Brazilian comedy films
Films shot in Manaus
Films shot in Ubatuba
Indigenous cinema in Latin America
Tainá (film series)
Brazilian sequel films
2004 comedy films